The following is an incomplete list of compositions by the Swedish composer Lars-Erik Larsson.

Orchestral works

Symphonies
 Symphony No. 1 in  D major, for orchestra (Op. 2, 1927–1928; withdrawn, unpublished)

 Symphonic Sketch, for orchestra (Op. 5, 1930) 
 Sinfonietta, for string orchestra (Op. 10, 1932; later disowned; published by Universal Edition)

 Symphony No. 2 in  E minor, for orchestra (Op. 17, 1936–1937; withdrawn, unpublished)

 Symphony No. 3 in C minor, for orchestra (Op. 34, 1944–1945; withdrawn, unpublished)

Concertante
 Saxophone Concerto, for alto saxophone and string orchestra (Op. 14, 1934, revised ; published by )

 Cello Concerto, for cello and orchestra (Op. 37, 1946–1947) 

 Violin Concerto, for violin and orchestra (Op. 42, 1952; new cadenza composed in 1976; published by )

 Twelve Concertinos, for various soloists and string orchestra (Op. 45, 1953–1957)
 Flute Concertino (Op. 45/1, 1955; published by )

 Oboe Concertino (Op. 45/2, 1955; published by )

 Clarinet Concertino (Op. 45/3, 1957; published by )

 Bassoon Concertino (Op. 45/4, 1955; published by )

 Horn Concertino (Op. 45/5, 1955; published by )

 Trumpet Concertino (Op. 45/6, 1954; published by )

 Trombone Concertino (Op. 45/7, 1955; published by )

 Violin Concertino (Op. 45/8, 1956; published by )

 Viola Concertino (Op. 45/9, 1957; published by )

 Cello Concertino (Op. 45/10, 1956; published by )

 Double Bass Concertino (Op. 45/11, 1957; published by )

 Piano Concertino (Op. 45/12, 1957; published by )

Stage works
 The Princess from Cyprus, opera in four acts for soloists, mixed chorus, and orchestra (Op. 9, 1930–1937; withdrawn, unpublished); text by Zacharias Topelius  
 The Arrest on Bohus, opera buffa for soloists, mixed chorus, and orchestra (1938–1939; unpublished)
 Sankta Lucia, incidental music for narrator, five soloists, mixed choir, and orchestra (Op. 36, 1946); text by Martin Hagenfeldt 
 Linden, folk-dance ballet in one act comprising four scenes (Op. 46, 1957–1958)

Vocalists and orchestra
 A Fiddler's Last Journey , ballad for baritone and orchestra (Op. 1, 1927)
 The Bright Country, cantata for soprano, baritone, mixed chorus, and orchestra (Op. 11, 1932)

 Invocatio, for chorus and orchestra (Op. 21, 1938)
 God in Disguise, lyrical suite for narrator, soprano, baritone, chorus, and orchestra to a poem by Hjalmar Gullberg (Op. 24, 1940) 

 Watchman's Songs, for baritone, male chorus, and orchestra (Op. 25, 1940); text by Karl Ragnar Gierow 
 Voices from Skansen, lyric suite for narrator, baritone, chorus, and orchestra (Op. 26, 1941)
 The Red Cross, cantata for narrator, baritone, chorus, and orchestra (Op. 30, 1944)
 The Sundial and the Urn, cantata for baritone, mixed chorus, and orchestra (Op. 53, 1966); text by Karl Ragnar Gierow

Other orchestral
 Concert Overture No. 1, for orchestra (Op. 4, 1929)
 Divertimento No. 1, for chamber orchestra (Op. 7, 1931–1932; withdrawn)
 Little Serenade, for string orchestra (Op. 12, 1934; published by Universal Edition)

 Concert Overture No. 2, for orchestra (Op. 13, 1934; published by Universal Edition)
 Divertimento No. 2, for chamber orchestra (Op. 15, 1935; published by Universal Edition)

 A Winter's Tale, four vignettes for orchestra after Shakespeare [excerpted from the lyrical suite by the same name] (Op. 18, 1937–1938)

 The Hours of Day, lyrical suite for orchestra to poems by Erik Blomberg, Kerstin Hed, Oscar Levertin, and Verner von Heidenstam (1937–1938);  = Not included in the Pastoral Suite

 Pastoral Suite, suite for orchestra excerpted from The Hours of Day (Op. 19, 1937–1938)

 The Earth Sings, for narrator and orchestra (Op. 23, 1940)
 Festmusik, for orchestra (Op. 22, 1939)
 The Earth Sings, for narrator and orchestra (Op. 23, 1940)
 The Swedish Nation, lyrical suite for chamber orchestra (Op. 27, 1941)
 : Folk-song Night, for string orchestra is from this suite)
 Gustavian Suite, for flute, harpsichord, and string orchestra (Op. 28, 1944); excerpted from the film score to The Royal Hunt

 Two Pieces, for orchestra (Op. 32, 1944)

 Music for Orchestra (Op. 40, 1949)

 Adagio, for string orchestra (Op. 48, 1960)
 Three Orchestral Pieces (Op. 49, 1960)

 Variations for Orchestra (Op. 50, 1962)
 Lyric Fantasy, for little orchestra (Op. 54, 1967)
 Due auguri, for orchestra (Op. 62, 1971; published by )

 Barococo (Råå-rokoko), suite for orchestra (Op. 64, 1973)

 Musica permutatio, for orchestra (Op. 66, 1980)

Chamber

Quartets and quintets
 Late Autumn Leaves, lyrical suite for string quartet to poems by Ola Hansson (1938);  = Not included in Intimate Miniatures

 Intimate Miniatures, suite for string quartet excerpted from Late Autumn Leaves (Op. 20, 1938; published by )

 String Quartet No. 1 in D minor (Op. 31, 1944)

 String Quartet No. 2,  (Op. 44, 1955; published by )

 Quattro tempi, divertimento for wind quintet, i.e., flute, oboe, clarinet, horn, and bassoon (Op. 55, 1968; published by )

 Aubade, for oboe and string trio, i.e., violin, viola, and cello (Op. 63, 1972; published by )

 String Quartet No. 3 (Op. 65, 1975; published by )

Duos
 Violin Sonatina in G minor, for violin and piano (Op. 3, 1928; published by )

 Duo, for violin and viola (Op. 6, 1931)
 Cello Sonatina, for cello and piano (Op. 60, 1969; published by )

 Three Pieces, for clarinet and piano (Op. 61, 1970; published by )

Piano
 Summer Evenings (1926; published by )

 Three Poems (1926; published by )

 Two Humoresques ( (1926; published by )

 Ten Two-part Piano Pieces (Op. 8, 1932)
 Piano Sonatina No. 1 (Op. 16, 1936; published by Universal Edition) 

 Croquiser (Op. 38, 1947; published by )

 Piano Sonatina No. 2 (Op. 39, 1946–1947; published by )

 Piano Sonatina No. 3 (Op. 41, 1950; published by )

 Twelve Little Piano Pieces ((Op. 47, 1960) published by )
 Easy Pieces (Op. 56, 1969; published by )
 Five Piano Pieces (Op. 57, 1969; published by )

 Seven Little Fugues with Preludes in the Old Style (Op. 58, 1969; published by )

To do
1944 Op. 29, Four songs
1945 Op. 33, Two songs
1946 Op. 35, Nine Gullberg Songs
1954 Op. 43, Missa Brevis, for mixed chorus
1964 Op. 51, Intrada Solemnis, for trumpets, trombones, double choir, boys choir and organ
1964 Op. 52, Eight songs
1969 Op. 59, Tre Citat, for choir

Notes, references, and sources

  
  
 
 
  
 
 
 
  

Compositions by Lars-Erik Larsson
Larsson, Lars-Erik